The Del Mar Fairgrounds is a  event venue in Del Mar, California. The annual San Diego County Fair  is held here, which was called the Del Mar Fair from 1984 to 2001. In 1936, the Del Mar Racetrack was built by the Thoroughbred Club with founding member Bing Crosby providing leadership.

The Fairgrounds is owned by the State of California and is managed by the 22nd District Agricultural Association, a state agency that hosts more than 300 annual events. Its staff organizes four major annual events, including the annual San Diego County Fair, and runs Surfside Race Place, the year-round satellite horse racing facility. The Del Mar Thoroughbred Club leases the facilities for their live meets each year. The Del Mar Fairgrounds and Del Mar Thoroughbred Club all share just one address for the entire complex, 2260 Jimmy Durante Blvd, Del Mar CA 92014.

History
After the successful opening of the Santa Anita Park racetrack in Arcadia, California on Christmas Day 1934, William A. Quigley, stockbroker, former college football coach, and resident of La Jolla formed the idea of starting a racetrack on the Del Mar Fairgrounds. He successfully pitched this to Bing Crosby, and together they founded the Del Mar turf Club on May 6, 1936. Quigley would remain General Manager of the racetrack until his death at the age of 49 in 1942. When Del Mar opened in 1937, Bing Crosby was at the gate to personally greet the fans. On August 12, 1938, the Del Mar Thoroughbred Club hosted a $25,000 winner-take-all match race between Charles S. Howard's Seabiscuit and the Binglin Stable's colt, Ligaroti. In an era when horse racing ranked second in popularity with Americans to Major League Baseball, the match race was much written and talked about and was the first nationwide broadcast of a Thoroughbred race by NBC radio. In the race, Seabiscuit was ridden by jockey George Woolf and Ligaroti by Noel Richardson. In front of a record crowd that helped make the fledgling Del Mar race track a success, Seabiscuit won by a nose.

By 1940, Del Mar became a summer playground for many Hollywood stars. Between 1942 and 1944, the facility was closed due to the Second World War. Initially, the grounds were used for training by the United States Marine Corps, then as a manufacturing site for parts to B-17 bombers.

The first Bing Crosby Stakes was held at Del Mar in 1946 and that same year the Santa Fe Railroad began offering a racetrack special bringing spectators, bettors, and horses to Del Mar from Los Angeles. Throughout the late 1940s and 1950s, the track became the Saratoga of the West for summer racing. The track had large purses for many stakes, many of which were won by the famous jockey Bill Shoemaker.

Throughout the 1960s and 1970s, Del Mar continued to be one of the premier racetracks in the country. The track attempted to run a fall meet in the 1960s but later canceled it after lackluster results. This allowed for the creation of the Oak Tree Racing Association at the Santa Anita race track.

Change marked the 1980s when the infield was opened to spectators and in 1984 Trevor Denman became the voice of Del Mar. The track continued to grow in purses, handle, and attendance.

In the 1990s, the track underwent a major renovation. The grandstand of the Del Mar Fairgrounds was demolished and replaced. In 1991, the track ran its richest race to date, the $1,000,000 Grade I Pacific Classic Stakes. The first Classic was won by a top
three-year-old named Best Pal.

Beginning in 2000, the Del Mar Thoroughbred Club's marketing team went through a major shift in their marketing direction. They realized they had to attract a more youthful audience as well as a female audience. They focused Del Mar as a fashionable destination, using social media and other avenues to market the racetrack. The majority of ads did not show horses. They adopted the slogan "Cool as Ever" and created a new brand around "Del Mar Scene". They also hired jockey and model Chantal Sutherland to be the new face of the Del Mar Thoroughbred Club.

Their strategy worked as over 13 years later Del Mar has changed their demographics and audience attendance. The marketing campaign of the Del Mar Racetrack has become a Stanford business study to see if their strategy could be done at other racetracks.

One of the largest draws each year for the Del Mar racetrack has become Opening Day with its hats contest and parties.

In March 2013, there was a vote to expand the turf portion of the racetrack. Construction began later in the year, and the work was completed in time for the 2014 racing season. The work included widening the course to 80 feet and softening the curve coming out of the diagonal chute, thus allowing more horses to compete in turf races. The following year, Del Mar renovated the main track, installing El Segundo Sand.

Starting in 2014, Del Mar began to run more racing cards due to the closure of the Hollywood Park Racetrack. A fall meet was added, featuring the Hollywood Turf Cup Stakes, Hollywood Derby, and Matriarch Stakes. Del Mar hosted the Breeders' Cup for the first time in November 2017.

The meet in 2020 was held behind closed doors due to the COVID-19 pandemic. Larry Collmus temporarily replaced Denman as Voice of Del Mar after 36 years for the summer meet. Denman did return for the fall meet in November, and resumed calling the Del Mar races in July 2021.

The 2021 meets will see fans return, but attendees must wear masks and social distancing measures be adhered to.

Events 
There are over 300 events that take place on the Del Mar Fairgrounds. Some of the most well known include:
 San Diego County Fair previous known as Del Mar Fair
 Del Mar National Horse Show
 Scream Zone
 Holiday of Lights

Racing
The track races from July to September as well as a second meet in November through early December as of 2014. The following graded events were held at Del Mar in 2022.

Grade 1 :
 Bing Crosby Stakes
 Clement L. Hirsch Stakes
 Del Mar Debutante Stakes	
 Del Mar Futurity	
 Del Mar Oaks	
 Pacific Classic Stakes

Grade 2 :
 Del Mar Mile Handicap
 Del Mar Derby	
 Del Mar Handicap
 Eddie Read Stakes	
 Hollywood Turf Cup Stakes
 John C. Mabee Stakes
 Pat O'Brien Stakes		
 San Clemente Stakes
 San Diego Handicap
 Seabiscuit Handicap
 Sorrento Stakes
 Yellow Ribbon Handicap

Grade 3 :
 Best Pal Stakes
 Bob Hope Stakes
 Cecil B. DeMille Stakes
 Cougar II Stakes
 Del Mar Juvenile Turf Stakes
 Green Flash Handicap
 Jimmy Durante Stakes
 La Jolla Handicap
 Native Diver Stakes
 Rancho Bernardo Handicap
 Red Carpet Stakes
 Torrey Pines Stakes

Ungraded stakes:
 Adoration Stakes
 Betty Grable Stakes
 Cary Grant Stakes
 Daisycutter Handicap
 Del Mar Juvenile Fillies Turf Stakes
 Desi Arnaz Stakes
 Shared Belief Stakes (formerly the El Cajon)
 Oceanside Stakes
 Osunitas Stakes
 Pirate's Bounty Stakes
 Solana Beach Handicap
 Tranquility Lake Stakes
 Wickerr Stakes
 Windy Sands Handicap

Discontinued stakes :
 Cabrillo Handicap
 Junior Miss Stakes

Other events
 Opening Day at Del Mar with their famous hat contest
 Friday Night Concerts which are free with paid admission before the last race, otherwise the concerts are $30 to attend. Prepaid tickets and promotional tickets are invalid for just the concerts.  
 Family Fun Day every Saturday and Sunday where the infield offers free entertainment for kids.
Camp Del Mar: A Daycare center for the kids while the parents are spending the day at the track (discontinued in 2019).
 Giveaway Days: The items vary each year what is being given away

Arena 
Del Mar Arena is a 3,500-seat arena in the fairgrounds complex; and it is used for sporting events, concerts, and other special events. It was built in 1991. In 2009, it was remodeled and a roof was added.

It was home of the  San Diego Sockers indoor soccer team from 2009 to 2012. The Del Mar National Horse Show is hosted here.

Exhibit facilities 
Del Mar Fairgrounds features six exhibit halls totalling  of space.

Del Mar Golf Center 
The Del Mar Fairgrounds includes the Del Mar Golf Center  The Golf Center includes two 18 hole miniature golf courses, a driving range, the Golf Mart golf store, and offers private lessons, clinics, and classes.

During peak demand periods, e.g. during the Live Races and the San Diego Fair, the driving range is used for additional parking.

Racetrack 

With a capacity of 44,000, it is the second largest horse-racing venue in the western United States, after the nearby Santa Anita Park. It is known for the slogans: "Where The Turf Meets The Surf" as well as "Cool as Ever." It was built by a partnership including Bing Crosby, actors Pat O'Brien, Gary Cooper, Joe E. Brown, Charles S. Howard and Oliver Hardy. A 100-mile AAA championship Indianapolis-type car race was held at Del Mar in November 1949, but the death of popular local driver Rex Mays in that event caused "big car" racing to disappear from Southern California circuits for 18 years. (In addition, the horse racing community was deeply resentful of oil-dripping cars being run on the horse-oriented dirt racing surface.)

There was a temporary auto-racing circuit held in the race track parking lot during the mid-1960s and between 1987 and 1992. The latter hosted an IMSA Camel GT race.

The Del Mar racetrack runs live racing from July through early September and, since 2014, a second live meet is run in November. A satellite wagering facility operates during the other months of the year. Larry Collmus temporarily replaced Trevor Denman in 2020 after 36 years due to the COVID-19 pandemic; Denman returned to announcing at Del Mar in July 2021.

Race Lap Records

Physical attributes
The track has a one-mile oval with chutes for 7/8 and -mile races and a seven-eighths mile oval with a diagonal straightaway chute for 1 1/16 and 1 1/8 mile races on the turf course.  The turf is a mixture of Common Bermuda and Hybrid Bermuda (GN-1). The track hosts live racing for two seasons each year at the Del Mar Fairgrounds and can stable more than two thousand horses.  Del Mar is known for its tan stucco grandstand located in close proximity to the Pacific Ocean.

In early 2007, Del Mar became the second track in Southern California to install a synthetic surface and the first to install a Polytrack brand surface   for a price of approximately $9 million. However, in February 2014 Del Mar president Joe Harper announced his intention to return to a dirt surface for the 2015 racing season. Harper cited a lack of synthetic surfaces in Southern California as the reason for the switch. At the time, both Santa Anita Park and Hollywood Park had both experimented with a synthetic surface but then reverted to dirt.

TV personalities
 Ernie Myers
Jon Lies (2007–present)
Bob Ike (?–present)
Mike Willman (?-2006 full-time, 2007–2009 part-time)

Premium clubs
The Turf Club

The Turf Club is the Premium Club of the Del Mar Thoroughbred Club.  You must be a member, or a guest of a member, to visit the Turf Club. A buttoned up shirt and jacket are required attire for men.

The Saddle Club

The Saddle Club is the Premium Club of Surfside Race Place.  Anybody may visit for a daily fee.  There is no required dress code.

The two clubs have no relation to one another.  Membership in one doesn't grant access to the other one.

Satellite wagering 

Surfside Race Place is located on the Del Mar Fairgrounds. The off-track betting facility is open during the off-season of the Del Mar Racetrack live meets.

It has been used for handicapping contests as well as handicapping seminars. The 2014 Handicapper of the year Jose Arias qualified and won here. His check at the end was $750,000.

Patrons of the Surfside Race Place sports bar can view, and bet on, horse races televised via satellite from around the country, such as Aqueduct, Arlington Park, Belmont Park, Calder, Cal Expo Harness, Churchill Downs, Delaware Park, Ellis Park, Fair Grounds, Golden Gate Fields, Gulfstream Park, Hastings, Hawthorne, Kentucky Downs, Laurel Park, Los Alamitos, Meadowlands, Monmouth Park, Oaklawn Park, Pimlico, Remington, Santa Anita Park, Saratoga, Sunland Park, Turfway Park, Victoria Race Tracks, and Woodbine; high-stakes races such as the Dubai World Cup; and Grade 1 races such as the Kentucky Derby, Preakness Stakes, and Belmont Stakes which constitute the Triple Crown.

Surfside Race Place currently offers Bingo on Sundays.

Del Mar Horsepark 
The park offers: 
Two grass jumping stadiums with seating for 1,320 
Covered and lighted arena 
Four show rings 
400 permanent show stalls 
Dressage ring 
Four training rings

During the San Diego Fair the Del Mar Horsepark offers free parking for the fairgrounds patrons with free shuttle service to the fairgrounds.

Del Mar Municipal Airport
In the 1920s, the United States Navy built the San Dieguito Air Field  on the wetlands between the San Dieguito River, the Del Mar Racetrack, and the area where Interstate 5 now runs. In 1938, the airfield was turned over to civilian control and became the  Del Mar Municipal Airport. It served the patrons at the new Del Mar Fairgrounds. During World War II, the navy took control of the airfield, establishing U.S. Naval Air Facility Del Mar, a base for blimps to patrol the West Coast. After the war, the field was decommissioned and returned to the State of California. In 1959, the state closed the airport and the land was used for the construction of Interstate 5.

See also 
 List of convention centers in the United States

References

Further reading 
 Holtzclaw, Kenneth M. Del Mar Racetrack (2006) Arcadia Publishing 
 Del Mar Media Guide

External links 
 Del Mar Fairgrounds
 San Diego Fair
 Del Mar Thoroughbred Club
 Surfside Raceplace
 Del Mar Golf Center
 Del Mar Antique Show
 Del Mar Thoroughbred Club
 Del Mar Diamond Club

Fairgrounds in California
Del Mar, California
Sports venues in San Diego County, California
Convention centers in California
Indoor arenas in California
Indoor soccer venues in California
IMSA GT Championship circuits
Del Mar Racetrack
Horse racing venues in California
1937 establishments in California
Sports venues completed in 1937